Sabah Football Club is an Azerbaijani professional football club based in Masazır. The team plays in the Azerbaijan Premier League, their top tier of Azerbaijani football.

History 

Sabah were formed on 8 September 2017, joining the Azerbaijan First Division for the 2017–18 season, in which they finished 5th. After the four teams above them in the league failed or decline promotion, Sabah were granted a license to participate in Azerbaijan Premier League on 12 May 2018. Sabah's first game in the Azerbaijan Premier League was against Keşla on 12 August 2018, a game they won 1-0 thanks to a Marko Dević goal. Sabah went on to finish their first Premier League season in 7th position, avoiding relegation.

On 16 September 2019, Elshad Ahmadov resigned as manager with Igor Ponomaryov taking over on an interim basis.

On 26 November 2019, Sabah announced that Željko Sopić had been appointed manager on an 18-month contract. On 3 July 2020, Sopić resigned as manager.

On 10 July 2020, Sabah signed 2 years contract with Vicente Gómez. On 11 March 2021, Gómez left his role as Head Coach by mutual agreement, with Ramin Guliyev being placed in temporary charge. At the end of the season, Guliyev was confirmed as the clubs new Head Coach on a two-year contract Guliyev resigned from his position on 21 October 2021, with Murad Musayev being appointed as the clubs new Head Coach on 30 October 2021, signing a two-year contract.

Domestic history

Colours and badge 
Sabah's features rays of sunshine incased in a shield.
The team's main colours are blue-white, with their kit being made by Spanish clothing company Joma during their first season, and Macron from the start of the 2018-19 season.

Stadium 

The club play their home games at the Bank Respublika Arena in Masazır, which has a capacity of 13,000.

Players

Current squad 

For recent transfers, see Transfers summer 2022.

Out on loan

Reserve team

Sabah-2 plays in the Azerbaijan First Division from 2018.

Club officials

Management

Coaching staff

Club Records

Top goalscorers

Managerial statistics
Information correct as of match played 15 March 2023. Only competitive matches are counted.

Notes:

References

 
Football clubs in Baku
Association football clubs established in 2017
2017 establishments in Azerbaijan